Paňovce is a village and municipality in Košice-okolie District in the Kosice Region of eastern Slovakia.

History
Historical records first mention the village in 1317.

Geography
The village lies at an altitude of 241 metres and covers an area of  20.678 km². It has a population of 570 people.

Ethnicity
The population is about 90% Slovak and 10% Magyar in ethnicity.

Culture
The village has a small public library and a general store.

Sports
The village has a number of good sport facilities including a swimming pool, football ground and a gymnasium.

The postcode is 044 71.

External links

Villages and municipalities in Košice-okolie District